Rafael "Rafa" Ferreira de Souza, commonly known as Rafael "Rafa" Mineiro, (born June 3, 1988) is a Brazilian professional basketball player.  He currently plays with the Flamengo team of the Novo Basquete Brasil, in Brazil.

Professional career
In his pro club career, Mineiro has played in both the South American 2nd-tier level FIBA South American League, and the South American 1st-tier level FIBA Americas League.

National team career
Mineiro represented the senior men's Brazilian national basketball team at the 2015 FIBA AmeriCup, in Mexico City. He also played at the 2017 FIBA AmeriCup.

NBB career statistics

NBB regular season

NBB playoffs

References

External links
 FIBA Profile
 Latinbasket.com Profile
 NBB Player Profile 

1988 births
Living people
Associação Limeirense de Basquete players
Basketball players at the 2015 Pan American Games
Brazilian men's basketball players
Centers (basketball)
Club Athletico Paulistano basketball players
Esporte Clube Pinheiros basketball players
Flamengo basketball players
Franca Basquetebol Clube players
Medalists at the 2015 Pan American Games
Novo Basquete Brasil players
Pan American Games gold medalists for Brazil
Pan American Games medalists in basketball
People from Uberaba
Power forwards (basketball)
São José Basketball players
Sportspeople from Minas Gerais